Cambodian–Kosovar relations are foreign relations between Cambodia and Kosovo.  There are no formal diplomatic relations between the two states as Cambodia has not recognized Kosovo as a sovereign state.

History 

Cambodia supports Serbia's position on the Kosovo issue, and the government has pledged its support for Serbia's territorial integrity.

On 6 October 2008, the Europe Department Director at the Ministry of Foreign Affairs and International Cooperation of Cambodia, Kao Samreth, stressed that Cambodia did not wish to encourage secession in any country and therefore did not support the independence of Kosovo. Kao drew parallels to independence claims for South Ossetia and stated that Cambodia would not encourage tension within a country by supporting independence claims.

In February 2009, Secretary of State at Ministry of Foreign Affairs and International Cooperation of Cambodia, Ouch Borith, reiterated an earlier Cambodian Ministry of Foreign Affairs statement that Kosovo was a sensitive issue which they were studying carefully, questioning, "if Kosovo is recognized, what about South Ossetia?" In April 2009, it was stated that Cambodia had no plans to file a brief (either supportive of Serbia or Kosovo) in the International Court of Justice case.

See also 

 Foreign relations of Cambodia
 Foreign relations of Kosovo
 Cambodia–Serbia relations

Notes

References 

Kosovo
Cambodia